Cyclaspis is a genus of cumacean crustaceans in the subfamily Bodotriinae, containing the following species:

Cyclaspis adiastolos Corbera, Tirado & Martin, 2005
Cyclaspis affinis Lomakina, 1968
Cyclaspis agrenosculpta Tafe & Greenwood, 1996
Cyclaspis alba Roccatagliata, 1986
Cyclaspis alveosculpta Tafe & Greenwood, 1996
Cyclaspis amamiensis Gamo, 1963
Cyclaspis andersoni Tafe & Greenwood, 1996
Cyclaspis antipai Petrescu, 1995
Cyclaspis argus Zimmer, 1902
Cyclaspis aspera Hale, 1944
Cyclaspis australis Sars, 1887
Cyclaspis australora Day, 1978
Cyclaspis bacescui Omholt & Heard, 1982
Cyclaspis bengalensis Kurian, 1954
Cyclaspis bicornis Zimmer, 1921
Cyclaspis bidens Gamo, 1962
Cyclaspis bituberculata Donath-Hernandez, 1988
Cyclaspis bovis Hale, 1928
Cyclaspis breedyae Petrescu & Heard, 2004
Cyclaspis brevipes Hale, 1948
Cyclaspis cana Hale, 1944
Cyclaspis candida Zimmer, 1921
Cyclaspis candidoides Bacescu, 1992
Cyclaspis caprella Hale, 1936
Cyclaspis chaunosculpta Tafe & Greenwood, 1996
Cyclaspis cheveyi Fage, 1945
Cyclaspis cingulata Calman, 1907
Cyclaspis clarki Hale, 1944
Cyclaspis coelebs Calman, 1917
Cyclaspis concepcionensis Donath-Hernandez, 1988
Cyclaspis concinna Hale, 1944
Cyclaspis cooki Tafe & Greenwood, 1996
Cyclaspis costata Calman, 1904
Cyclaspis cottoni Hale, 1937
Cyclaspis cretata Hale, 1944
Cyclaspis cristulata Gamo, 1987
Cyclaspis daviei Tafe & Greenwood, 1996
Cyclaspis dentifrons Zimmer, 1944
Cyclaspis dolera Zimmer, 1944
Cyclaspis elegans Calman, 1907
Cyclaspis exsculpta Sars, 1886
Cyclaspis formosae Zimmer, 1921
Cyclaspis fulgida Hale, 1944
Cyclaspis gezamuelleri Petrescu, 1998
Cyclaspis gibba Hale, 1944
Cyclaspis gigas Zimmer, 1907
Cyclaspis globosa Hale, 1944
Cyclaspis goesii (Sars, 1871)
Cyclaspis goytacazes Brito & Serejo, 2020
Cyclaspis gracialis Hansen, 1908
Cyclaspis granulata (Radha Devi & Kurian, 1981)
Cyclaspis granulosa Hale, 1944
Cyclaspis herdmani Calman, 1904
Cyclaspis hornelli Calman, 1904
Cyclaspis indoaustralica Bacescu, 1992
Cyclaspis iorgui Ortiz & Lalana, 2002
Cyclaspis iphinoides Bacescu & Muradian, 1975
Cyclaspis jamaicensis Petrescu, Illiffe, Sarbu, 1993
Cyclaspis jonesi Roccatagliata, 1985
Cyclaspis juxta Hale, 1948
Cyclaspis kensleyi Petrescu, 2002
Cyclaspis kerguelenensis Ledoyer, 1977
Cyclaspis levis Thomson, 1892
Cyclaspis lilianae Brito & Serejo, 2020
Cyclaspis linguiloba Liu & Liu, 1990
Cyclaspis lissa Muhlenhardt-Siegel, 2003
Cyclaspis longicaudata Sars, 1865
Cyclaspis longipes Calman, 1907
Cyclaspis lucida Hale, 1944
Cyclaspis marisrubri Bacescu & Muradian, 1975
Cyclaspis mawsonae Hale, 1944
Cyclaspis mexicansis (Radha Devi & Kurian, 1981)
Cyclaspis micans Roccatagliata, 1985
Cyclaspis mihaibacescui Petrescu, 2008
Cyclaspis mjoebergi Zimmer, 1921
Cyclaspis mollis Hale, 1944
Cyclaspis munda Hale, 1944
Cyclaspis nalbanti Petrescu, 1998
Cyclaspis nitida Hale, 1944
Cyclaspis nubila Zimmer, 1936
Cyclaspis ornosculpta Tafe & Greenwood, 1996
Cyclaspis oxyura Roccatagliata & Moreira, 1987
Cyclaspis perelegans Roccatagliata & Moreira, 1987
Cyclaspis persculpta Calman, 1905
Cyclaspis peruana Zimmer, 1943
Cyclaspis picta Calman, 1904
Cyclaspis pinguis Hale, 1944
Cyclaspis platymerus Zimmer, 1944
Cyclaspis popescugorji Petrescu, 1998
Cyclaspis prolifica Bacescu, 1990
Cyclaspis pruinosa Hale, 1944
Cyclaspis pura Hale, 1936
Cyclaspis purpurascens Gamo, 1964
Cyclaspis pusilla Sars, 1886
Cyclaspis pustulata Zimmer, 1943
Cyclaspis quadrituberculata Zimmer, 1907
Cyclaspis quadruplicata Kurian, 1951
Cyclaspis reticulata Roccatagliata, 1985
Cyclaspis roccatagliatae Petrescu, 1995
Cyclaspis rudis Hale, 1948
Cyclaspis sabulosa Hale, 1944
Cyclaspis sallai Tafe & Greenwood, 1996
Cyclaspis scissa Day, 1978
Cyclaspis sculptilis Roccatagliata, 1989
Cyclaspis sheardi Hale, 1944
Cyclaspis sibogae Calman, 1905
Cyclaspis similis Calman, 1907
Cyclaspis simonae Petrescu, Illiffe, Sarbu, 1993
Cyclaspis simula Hale, 1944
Cyclaspis spectabilis Zimmer, 1908
Cyclaspis spilotes Hale, 1928
Cyclaspis sterreri Petrescu, 2002
Cyclaspis stocki Bacescu, 1990
Cyclaspis striata Roccatagliata & Moreira, 1987
Cyclaspis strigilis Hale, 1944
Cyclaspis strumosa Hale, 1948
Cyclaspis subgrandis Jones, 1969
Cyclaspis sublevis Hale, 1948
Cyclaspis supersculpta Zimmer, 1921
Cyclaspis tasmanica Jones, 1969
Cyclaspis tesauna Brito & Serejo, 2020
Cyclaspis testudinum Zimmer, 1943
Cyclaspis thomsoni Calman, 1907
Cyclaspis tranteri Tafe & Greenwood, 1996
Cyclaspis tribulis Hale, 1928
Cyclaspis triplicata Calman, 1907
Cyclaspis unicornis Calman, 1907
Cyclaspis uniplicata Calman, 1907
Cyclaspis ursulae Muhlenhardt-Siegel, 2003
Cyclaspis usitata Hale, 1932
Cyclaspis vargasae Petrescu & Heard, 2004
Cyclaspis variabilis Roccatagliata, 1986
Cyclaspis varians Calman, 1912

References

Cumacea
Malacostraca genera